Robert Flint Chandler Jr.  (June 22, 1907 - March 23, 1999) was an American horticulturalist.

He obtained a degree in Horticulture from the University of Maine in 1929, and his Ph.D. in Pomology from the University of Maryland in 1934. He first taught at Cornell University and went on to become the Dean of the College of Agriculture, and then the ninth President, of the University of New Hampshire.

From 1959 to 1972, Dr. Chandler was the founding Director of the International Rice Research Institute (IRRI) in Los Banos, Philippines. Working with a team of twenty-four researchers from numerous countries in Southeast Asia, Dr. Chandler gathered thousands of rice varieties to be tested and eventually selected to be grown under various conditions. Dr. Chandler's leadership was instrumental in developing over two dozen new varieties of rice that produced higher yields than traditional strains and increased rice production. These varieties helped the Philippines to achieve self-sufficiency in rice by 1968, and still provide food for millions across Asia.

In 1971, Chandler was appointed as first Director General of the Asian Vegetable Research and Development Center (AVRDC). which was later renamed World Vegetable Center. (AVRD) in Taiwan.

In 1975, the government of the Republic of China awarded Chandler with the Order of Brilliant Star.

Dr. Chandler was awarded the Presidential End Hunger Award, and in 1988, he was awarded the World Food Prize for his leadership in building the agricultural research capacity at IRRI and AVRDC.

Selected works 
An Adventure in Applied Science: A History of the International Rice Research Institute, 1982

References

External links
University of New Hampshire: Office of the President
Full list of University Presidents (including interim Presidents), University of New Hampshire Library
"Guide to the Robert F. Chandler Papers, 1950-1954", University of New Hampshire Library
Robert Chandler Jr., Agronomist, Dies at 91, New York Times.
An Adventure in Applied Science: A History of the International Rice Research Institute(PDF)

1907 births
1999 deaths
American agronomists
American horticulturists
University of Maine alumni
University of Maryland, College Park alumni
Cornell University faculty
Presidents of the University of New Hampshire
20th-century American botanists
Recipients of the Order of Brilliant Star
Agriculture and food award winners
20th-century American academics
20th-century agronomists